Värmland Finnish dialect is an extinct Savonian dialect spoken in Värmland by the Forest Finns. However some speakers also lived in Norway.

In Savonian dialects, a vowel is inserted in the middle of a word talavi 'winter' (written Finnish "talvi"), however this feature is completely lacking from Värmland Finnish, which suggests it was a later development in Savonian.

History 
Savo Finnish speakers came to Sweden during the 1600s (mainly from Rautalampi). During the 1800s, there were thousands of Finnish speakers in Värmland. Unlike Savonian, the Värmland dialect did not have consonant gemination or the schwa, because they were later developments in the Savonian dialects spoken in Finland.

By the 1960s, only a few descendants of the original Savonians who had spoken Finnish as children remained. The last speakers of Värmland Savonian were Johansson-Oinoinen and Karl Persson, who died in 1965 and 1969.

References 

Finnish dialects